The European Qualification Tournament for the 2020 Men's Olympic Volleyball Tournament was a volleyball tournament for men's national teams held in Berlin, Germany from 5 to 10 January 2020. Eight teams played in the tournament and the winners France qualified for the 2020 Summer Olympics.

Qualification
The hosts Germany and the top seven ranked teams from the CEV European Ranking as of 30 September 2019 which had not yet qualified to the 2020 Summer Olympics qualified for the tournament. Rankings are shown in brackets except the hosts who ranked tenth.

 (Hosts)
 (1)
 (3)
 (6)
 (7)
 (8)
 (9)
 (11)

Pools composition
Teams were seeded following the serpentine system according to their CEV European Ranking as of 30 September 2019. CEV reserved the right to seed the hosts as head of pool A regardless of the European Ranking.

Venue

Pool standing procedure
 Number of matches won
 Match points
 Sets ratio
 Points ratio
 Result of the last match between the tied teams

Match won 3–0 or 3–1: 3 match points for the winner, 0 match points for the loser
Match won 3–2: 2 match points for the winner, 1 match point for the loser

Preliminary round
All times are Central European Time (UTC+01:00).

Pool A

|}

|}

Pool B

|}

|}

Final round
All times are Central European Time (UTC+01:00).

Semifinals

|}

Final

|}

Final standing

Qualifying team for Summer Olympics

Awards

Most Valuable Player
 Jean Patry
Best Setter
 Lukas Kampa
Best Outside Spikers
 Denys Kaliberda
 Earvin N'Gapeth

Best Middle Blockers
 Viktor Yosifov
 Nicolas Le Goff
Best Opposite Spiker
 Jean Patry
Best Libero
 Jenia Grebennikov

See also
Volleyball at the 2020 Summer Olympics – Women's European qualification

References

External links
Official website – FIVB
Official website – CEV
Event website – CEV
Final Standing
Most Valuable Player
Dream Team

2020 in volleyball
Volleyball qualification for the 2020 Summer Olympics
2020 in German sport
Sports competitions in Berlin
International volleyball competitions hosted by Germany
January 2020 sports events in Germany